Kirikiriroa may refer to:

The Māori name for Hamilton, New Zealand
Kirikiriroa statistical area within Hamilton
Kirikiriroa marae and meeting house in Pipiriki